Premier Sports Asia is a pay television sports channel operating in the Asia Pacific region owned by Premier Media Broadcasting. It primarily airs the sport of rugby union.

History
The channel, a sister channel of Irish-based Premier Sports, was launched on 22 October 2020 as an over-the-top (OTT) streaming channel for Asia. At its launch, the channel takes over the rights of Six Nations Championship and Autumn Nations Cup from Rugby Pass TV. Premier Sports Asia completed the takeover of all Rugby Pass customers on 31 July 2021.

Availability
As of 29 December 2021, Premier Sports Asia is available as OTT subscription channels (branded as Premier Sports 1, Premier Sports 2 and Premier Sports 3) in over 16 Asian countries (Bhutan, Brunei, Cambodia, Hong Kong, Indonesia, Laos, Macau, Malaysia, Maldives, Mongolia, Myanma, Philippines, Singapore, South Korea, Sri Lanka, Taiwan, Thailand, Vietnam). The channel is also available as a traditional linear channel (branded as Premier Sports) in Hong Kong, Singapore, Indonesia, Thailand, Sri Lanka and Malaysia, replacing the Rugby Pass TV channel in late 2021.

Coverage

Rugby union

  International tests
 Autumn Nations Cup
 2021 British & Irish Lions tour to South Africa
Autumn rugby union internationals
Mid-year rugby union internationals
 Six Nations Championship (from 2020)
 The Rugby Championship (from 2021)
 Super Rugby
 Premiership Rugby
 United Rugby Championship
 Bunnings NPC

Rugby league

 Super League
 National Rugby League
 State of Origin series

Australian Rules football 

 Australian Football League

See also
 Setanta Sports Asia
 Premier Sports

References

External links
 Premier Sports Asia

Sports television networks
Rugby union on television